Daniel Glacier is in Wenatchee National Forest in the U.S. state of Washington and is on the north slope of Mount Daniel. Daniel Glacier retreated almost  between 1950 and 2005. Daniel Glacier is separated from Lynch Glacier to the west by a ridge.

See also
List of glaciers in the United States

References

Glaciers of the North Cascades
Glaciers of Kittitas County, Washington
Glaciers of Washington (state)